Azerley is a village and civil parish in the Harrogate district of North Yorkshire, England.

The civil parish includes the larger village of Galphay, and also the village of Mickley.  The population of the parish in the 2001 census was 355, reducing to 340 at the 2011 Census.

Braithwaite Hall, about a mile south west of the village, is a Grade II listed building thought to date from the 16th century.  It should not be confused with Braithwaite Hall in Coverdale, a National Trust property.

References

External links
 
 

Villages in North Yorkshire
Civil parishes in North Yorkshire